Eulocastra is a genus of moths of the family Noctuidae.

Species
 Eulocastra aethiops (Distant, 1898)
 Eulocastra albipunctella Hampson, 1918
 Eulocastra alfierii (Wiltshire, 1948)
 Eulocastra argentifrons (Butler, 1889)
 Eulocastra argentisparsa Hampson, 1910
 Eulocastra argyrogramma Hampson, 1914
 Eulocastra argyrostrota Hampson, 1916
 Eulocastra bryophilioides Brandt, 1938
 Eulocastra capnoessa Zerny, 1915
 Eulocastra carnibasalis Hampson, 1918
 Eulocastra chrysarginea (Schaus, 1906)
 Eulocastra diaphora (Staudinger, 1878)
 Eulocastra ecphaea Dognin, 1914
 Eulocastra eurynipha (Turner, 1902)
 Eulocastra excisa (Swinhoe, 1885)
 Eulocastra fasciata Butler, 1886
 Eulocastra hypotaenia (Wallengren, 1860)
 Eulocastra incognita Berio, 1954
 Eulocastra insignis (Butler, 1884)
 Eulocastra leucobasis Hampson, 1910
 Eulocastra melaena (Hampson, 1899)
 Eulocastra monozona Hampson, 1910
 Eulocastra neoexcisa Berio, 1954
 Eulocastra nigrata Berio, 1960
 Eulocastra nirivittata (Warren, 1888)
 Eulocastra ochrizona Hampson, 1910
 Eulocastra pallida Hampson, 1918
 Eulocastra phaeella Hampson, 1918
 Eulocastra phaeozona Hampson, 1910
 Eulocastra platizona (Lederer, 1869)
 Eulocastra poliogramma Hampson, 1918
 Eulocastra pseudozarboides Rothschild, 1921
 Eulocastra quintana (Swinhoe, 1885)
 Eulocastra rex (Wiltshire, 1948)
 Eulocastra sahariensis Rothschild, 1921
 Eulocastra seminigra Hampson, 1914
 Eulocastra sudanensis Rebel, 1917
 Eulocastra tamsi Berio, 1938
 Eulocastra tamsina Brandt, 1947
 Eulocastra tapina Hampson, 1910
 Eulocastra tarachodes Hampson, 1914
 Eulocastra thermozona Hampson, 1910
 Eulocastra tripartita (Butler, 1886)
 Eulocastra zavattarii Berio, 1944

References
 Eulocastra at Markku Savela's Lepidoptera and Some Other Life Forms
 Natural History Museum Lepidoptera genus database

Acontiinae